Ölziibayaryn Nasanjargal (born 5 September 1955) is a Mongolian wrestler. He competed in the men's freestyle 62 kg at the 1980 Summer Olympics.

References

1955 births
Living people
Mongolian male sport wrestlers
Olympic wrestlers of Mongolia
Wrestlers at the 1980 Summer Olympics
Place of birth missing (living people)